The Gonow Xinglang (星朗) or Gonow Starry is a compact Multi Purpose Vehicle produced by China's Gonow Automobile, a subsidiary of Guangzhou Automobile. Patent was applied and granted in November 2011 with the launch of the production version in 2013 as a 2014 model.

The van was initially known as the Gonow GA6440.

History
The Xinglang made its debut on the Chinese market on August 20, 2013 with a ceremony attended by Gonow personnel, the press and other VIPs. Its MSRP is about 52,800 yuan for all models except for the 1.5L Premium, which is sold for 79,800 yuan.

Design
Engines available includes a 1.3L producing 99 hp and a 1.5L producing 113 hp, both mated to a 5-speed manual gearbox.

The Gonow Xinglang is controversial in terms of styling because it heavily resembles the Nissan NV200 despite minor changes.

Gallery

See also

 List of GAC vehicles

Chinese-made NV200 clones

 Refine M3 - Second Chinese-made NV200 clone in 2014.
 BYD M3 DM - Third Chinese-made NV200 clone in 2014.

Original Japanese-made van
 Nissan NV200

References

External links

 
 

Xinglang
Vans
Mini MPVs
Vehicles introduced in 2013
Front-wheel-drive vehicles
Cars of China